James MacGregor or Macgregor may refer to:

James MacGregor (minister) (1829–1894), New Zealand minister
Jim MacGregor (1887–1950), South African boxer
James Macgregor (MP) (1808–1858), British MP for Sandwich
Jimmie Macgregor (born 1930), folk singer and broadcaster
James MacGregor (moderator) (1832–1910), Moderator of the General Assembly of the Church of Scotland in 1891
 James Drummond MacGregor (1759–1830), Scottish Gaelic poet, abolitionist and Presbyterian minister
 James Gordon MacGregor (1852–1913), Canadian physicist

See also

 James McGregor (disambiguation)
 James McGrigor (disambiguation)